Leptin receptor, also known as LEP-R or OB-R, is a type I cytokine receptor, a protein that in humans is encoded by the LEPR gene. LEP-R functions as a receptor for the fat cell-specific hormone leptin. LEP-R has also been designated as CD295 (cluster of differentiation 295). Its location is the cell membrane, and it has extracellular, trans-membrane and intracellular sections (protein regions).

History
The Leptin Receptor was discovered in 1995 by Louis Tartaglia and his colleagues at  Millennium Pharmaceuticals. This same team demonstrated the leptin receptor was expressed by the mouse db gene. Furthermore, in 1996, after co-discovering the Leptin gene with Jeffrey Friedman et al. in 1994, (which involved a reverse genetic/positional cloning strategy to clone ob and db), Rudolph Leibel, working with collaborators also at Millennium Pharmaceuticals and colleague Streamson Chua, confirmed cloning of the leptin receptor by demonstrating that an apparent leptin receptor cloned from a choroid plexus library using leptin as ligand, mapped to a physical map that included db and fa.

Structure 
Like other cytokine receptors, Leptin receptor protein has three different regions: i) extracellular, ii) trans-membrane, and iii) intracellular. The extracellular part has 5 functional domains: i) membrane distal 1st cytokine receptor homology (CRH1), ii) Immunoglobulin like (Ig), iii) 2nd cytokine receptor homology (CRH2) and iv) two membrane proximal fibronectine type-III (FNIII) domains. CRH1 domains is not essential for Leptin binding, but may have regulatory roles. Ig domain interacts with Leptin and is essential for conformational change in the receptor upon ligand binding. CRH2 is essential for leptin binding, deletion of this domain abolishes the leptin binding. FNIII domains are essential for receptor activation upon leptin binding. The structure of the quaternary complex of the complete extracellular part in complex with the cognate ligand Leptin (i.e. 2 receptor and 2 ligand) has been solved by both electron microscopy and SAXS.

Function 
The leptin hormone regulates adipose-tissue mass through hypothalamus effects on hunger and energy use. It acts through the leptin receptor (LEP-R), a single-transmembrane-domain receptor of the cytokine receptor family. In hypothalamic neurons, adequate leptin receptor function and subsequent regulation of energy metabolism and body weight depends on interactions of the receptor with gangliosides in the cell membrane.

Clinical significance 
Variations in the leptin receptor have been associated with obesity and with increased susceptibility to Entamoeba histolytica infections.

Animals models 
The db/db mouse is a model of obesity, diabetes, and dyslipidemia wherein leptin receptor activity is deficient because the mice are homozygous for a point mutation in the gene for the leptin receptor. In db/db mice, induced swimming helped to overcome obesity by upregulating uncoupling proteins.

Leptin receptor and pregnancy 
The leptin hormone and its receptor, also known as maternal plasma leptin, play developmental roles during pregnancy. Leptin receptors have been identified in the placenta of pregnant women and also in fetal tissues. Those leptin receptors are secreted by the placenta; they increase leptin levels during pregnancy thereby aiding the fetal development.

References

Further reading

External links 
 

Clusters of differentiation